Abruka is a village in Estonia, primarily composed of the  island of Abruka in the Gulf of Riga, 4 km south of the island of Saaremaa.

Abruka is part of Saaremaa Parish, Saare County. The village has a population of 33 (as of 1 January 2011).

The first records about the population on Abruka originate from the Middle Ages, when the area was ruled by the Prussian State of the Teutonic Order; the Bishop of Ösel-Wiek founded a horse breeding manor on the largest island, named Abro in the Teutonic Order's Low German language. Permanent population developed in the 18th century. 1881–1972 an elementary school operated on Abruka.

Abruka is the site of a Central European-type broadleaf forest, which is rare in the region. To protect this a nature reserve was created in 1937.

There's a library (located in the harbour building) and a museum which is located on the side of the former manor park in the oldest building on Abruka (The Abruka House).

Abruka can be reached by postboat Heili from Roomassaare harbour in Kuressaare.

The twin writers Jüri Tuulik and Ülo Tuulik (born 1940) were born on Abruka.

Gallery

See also
Kasselaid

References

External links

www.abruka.ee
Abruka.pri.ee 

Estonian islands in the Baltic
Villages in Saare County